Myrtleville is a small seaside village in County Cork, Ireland. 18th and 19th century records of the local estate houses associate Myrtleville House with the Daunt family. The village lies within the townlands of Ballinluska and Myrtleville, just west of the entrance to Cork Harbour.

Myrtleville has one grocery shop, a pub/music venue, and a restaurant/bar. Crosshaven rugby club has its sports ground at the top of Myrtleville hill. The beach is used by swimmers all year round.

See also
 Fountainstown

References

Towns and villages in County Cork
Beaches of County Cork